The Greenleaf was an automobile manufactured in Lansing, Michigan by the Greenleaf Cycle Company in 1902.  The Greenleaf was a light surrey that was powered by a two-cylinder horizontal engine that developed 10 hp at 700 rpm.

References
 

Defunct motor vehicle manufacturers of the United States
Motor vehicle manufacturers based in Michigan
Vehicles built in Lansing, Michigan
Defunct manufacturing companies based in Michigan